The Berkeley Architectural Heritage Association (BAHA) is a Berkeley, California, non-profit organization whose mission is to "promote, through education, an understanding and appreciation for Berkeley’s history, and to encourage the preservation of its historic buildings." Incorporated on 9 December 1974, the organization has been active since 1971. The organization is headquartered at the McCreary-Greer house, gifted to the association by Ruth Alice Greer in 1986.

External links
 Berkeley Architectural Heritage Association website
 BAHA's Berkeley Landmarks website
 BAHA News

Culture of Berkeley, California
Heritage organizations
Historic preservation organizations in the United States
Non-profit organizations based in the San Francisco Bay Area
History of Berkeley, California
Architecture in the San Francisco Bay Area
1974 establishments in California